The Press Standards Board of Finance (Pressbof) was set up by the Press Council to raise a levy on the newspaper and periodical industries to finance the Council, which had previously been funded directly by newspaper proprietors. Pressbof later funded the Press Complaints Commission. This arrangement was intended to ensure secure and independent financial support for  effective self-regulation. Pressbof ceased to actively operate following the abolition of the Press Complaints Commission in 2014, and it was dissolved in August 2016.

Final membership

 Chairman: Lord Black of Brentwood, Executive Director of the Telegraph Media Group.
 Secretary & Treasurer: Jim Raeburn, director of the Scottish Newspaper Publishers Association  1984-2007
 Clive Milner, Chairman, Newspaper Publishers Association
 Robin Burgess, Chief Executive, Cumbrian Newspapers Group Ltd
 David Newell, Director, The Newspaper Society
 Nicholas Coleridge, Managing Director, Conde Nast Publications (UK)
 Barry McIlheney, Chief Executive, Professional Publishers Association
 Paul Dacre, Editor in Chief, Associated Newspapers plc
 John Fry, Chief Executive, Johnston Press plc
 Paul Vickers, Secretary and Group Legal Director, Trinity Mirror plc

External links
 PCC:  Press Standards Board of Finance

References 

Mass media complaints authorities